Samuel L. Greitzer (August 10, 1905 – February 22, 1988) was an American mathematician, the founding chairman of the United States of America Mathematical Olympiad, and the publisher of the precollege mathematics journal Arbelos. Together with H.S.M. Coxeter in 1967, Greitzer coauthored the well-received textbook Geometry Revisited, which has remained in print for more than 40 years.

Biography
Born in the Russian Empire, Greitzer moved to the United States in 1906, graduated from Stuyvesant High School, received his bachelor's degree in 1927 from City College of New York, and later earned a Ph.D. from Yeshiva University. He held academic positions at Yeshiva University, Brooklyn Polytechnic Institute, Columbia University, and Rutgers University. In the 1970s, he directed a National Science Foundation summer program at Rutgers for high-ability high-school math students.

Samuel Greitzer and his wife Ethel had one son. Samuel died on February 22, 1988, in Metuchen, New Jersey.

Selected publications

References

External links

1905 births
1988 deaths
20th-century American mathematicians
Geometers
Emigrants from the Russian Empire to the United States
City College of New York alumni
Yeshiva University alumni
Stuyvesant High School alumni
People from Metuchen, New Jersey
Yeshiva University faculty
Columbia University faculty
Rutgers University faculty
Polytechnic Institute of New York University faculty
Mathematicians from New York (state)